Springfield, New Jersey may refer to:

 Springfield Township, Burlington County, New Jersey
 Springfield Township, Union County, New Jersey
 Springfield/Belmont, Newark, New Jersey, a neighborhood of Newark

See also
Springfield (disambiguation)